The R764 road is a regional road in Ireland joining the villages of Roundwood and Ashford in County Wicklow. 

The road is 13km long.

Route
The road starts eastwards at a junction with the R755 in the village of Roundwood and terminates in Ashford at the R772 (the former N11 national primary road).

See also
Roads in Ireland
National primary road
National secondary road

References
Roads Act 1993 (Classification of Regional Roads) Order 2006 – Department of Transport

Regional roads in the Republic of Ireland
Roads in County Wicklow